Mario Ortiz may refer to:

 Mario Ortíz (sailor) (1911–?), Argentine Olympic sailor
 Mario Ortiz (Chilean footballer) (1936–2006), Chilean football midfielder
 Mario Ortíz (boxer) (1953–1978), Argentine Olympic boxer
 Mario Ortiz (Mexican footballer) (born 1983), Mexican football forward
 Mario Ortiz (Spanish footballer) (born 1989), Spanish football midfielder
 Mario Ortiz (politician) (1922–2015), Filipino politician and lawyer